Rosalba Casas Guerrero (born 1950) is a professor of History and Socio-politics at the Montreal University in Canada.

Education
Casas studied sociology at the National Autonomous University of Mexico (UNAM), and has a PhD in Science and Technology Policy from the University of Sussex in England.

Career and research
She is a regular member of the Mexican Academy of Sciences. She was the Director of the Social Research Institute at the UNAM from 2005 to 2013. She has written or co-written more than 10 books and more than 70 articles.

Casas' academic interests revolve around the development of science and technology and their potential to improve the life quality of different communities. She focuses on new understandings of public policy that put social problems that can be solved through expanded knowledge front and center. Her research has contributed to conversations about the social role of science and technology, and the strategic role of the state in developing countries to impulse STEM activities.

Selected works
 El estado y la política de la ciencia en México, 1935-1970, 1985
 Institucionalización de la política gubernamental de ciencia y tecnología, 1970-1976, 1986
 La biotecnología y sus repercusiones socioeconómicas y políticas, 1992
 Biotechnology and environmental concerns in Mexico : arguments for a research proposal, 1992
 Biotechnology in Mexico : opportunities and constraints in the agroindustrial sector, 1993
 La investigación biotecnológia en México : tendencias en el sector agroalimentario, 1993
 Las políticas sociales de México en los años noventa, 1996
 Gobierno, academia y empresas en México : hacia una nueva configuración de relaciones, 1997
 Ciencia, Tecnología y Poder. Elites y Campos de Lucha por el Control de las Política, 2000
 Reseña de "Los estudios de empresarios y empresas, 2008
 Democracia, conocimiento y cultura, 2012
 INFORME DIRECCION IISUNAM, 2009-2013, 2013
 Trayectoria de Investigación de Rosalba Casas Guerrero: 1975-2013, 2014
 La transferencia de conocimiento en biotecnología: formación de redes a nivel local, 2014
 Formación de redes de conocimiento: una perspectiva regional desde México, 2015

References 

1950 births
Living people
Alumni of the University of Sussex
Historians of technology
Members of the Mexican Academy of Sciences
National Autonomous University of Mexico alumni
Academic staff of the Université de Montréal
Date of birth missing (living people)
Place of birth missing (living people)
Nationality missing
Women historians